Thiruvasakam in Symphony (2005) is an oratorio composed and orchestrated by Ilaiyaraaja. Thiruvasagam is a collection of ancient Tamil poems written by Manikkavacakar. They were transcribed partially in English by American lyricist Stephen Schwartz. This is said to be the first Indian oratorio ever. It was performed by the Budapest Symphony Orchestra.

Track listing

References

External links 
 Ilaiyaraaja's Official site
 A detailed review of Thiruvasagam
 Lyrics in Tamil for Songs 2, 3 & 5
 Lyrics in Tamil for Songs 1,4 & 6
 Hollie Longman, The World of Music, Vol. 50, No. 2, Kwaito (2008), pp. 146-148 (3 pages)

2005 albums
Oratorios
2005 compositions